Jim Cross (born February 6, 1957) is a Canadian former professional ice hockey player. As a youth, he played in the 1967 Quebec International Pee-Wee Hockey Tournament with a minor ice hockey team from Pointe-Claire. During the 1977–78 WHA season, while playing Junior A hockey with the nearby St. Albert Saints in the AJHL, Cross was called up for two games in the World Hockey Association with the Edmonton Oilers.

References

External links

1957 births
Living people
Canadian ice hockey defencemen
Edmonton Oil Kings (WCHL) players
Edmonton Oilers (WHA) players
Portland Winterhawks players
St. Albert Saints players
Ice hockey people from Edmonton
Spruce Grove Mets players